WHFT-TV (channel 45) is a religious television station in Miami, Florida, United States, owned and operated by the Trinity Broadcasting Network (TBN). The station's studios and transmitter are located at the Lakeside Park (formerly Lake Trinity Estates) complex on Pembroke Road in Pembroke Park (with a Hollywood mailing address).

History
The station first signed on the air on March 17, 1975, as WFCB-TV; it originally operated as a religious independent station that was owned by Florida Christian Television. The sign-on took place more than five years after the original construction permit was issued on August 29, 1969. The station aired programming for five hours a day, running a few local church services, Bible instruction programs, children's Christian programming, and programs from nationally known television evangelists. Florida Christian Television's owners were unable to keep the station solvent, so they put the station up for sale in early 1976, with a request to sell it to a Christian ministry.

The Lester Sumrall Evangelistic Association (later known as LeSEA Broadcasting) acquired the station in July 1976, after Florida Christian Television opted to sell for lack of capital. The station's call letters were changed to WHFT-TV (standing for "World Harvest Florida Television"), and the station switch from viewer- to advertiser-supported. Initially, the station's schedule expanded to nine hours a day with the addition of more Christian programming, much of it added by LeSEA, along with televangelist programs such as The 700 Club; a further expansion soon after added additional secular family entertainment shows.

In 1980, a month after Sumrall declared that the station was not for sale, it was announced that WHFT would be purchased by the Trinity Broadcasting Network. While TBN promised to increase programming from local religious ministries, the station dropped all of its secular programs as part of the sale. Productions from the studios included the national Monday-night broadcast of Praise the Lord and a significant portion of TBN's Spanish-language output.

The Pembroke Park mobile home park—mostly home to seasonal French Canadian residents—where WHFT's tower and former studios are located—was purchased by TBN in 1983 to reduce conflicts with neighbors and was known as Trinity Towers. The complex was renamed Lakeside Park Estates in 2017. The tower has been climbed on several occasions—including twice by the same man, ten years apart.

Subchannels
 The station's digital signal continued to broadcast on its pre-transition UHF channel 46. Through the use of PSIP, digital television receivers display the station's virtual channel as its former UHF analog channel 45.

References

External links
 

HFT-TV
Trinity Broadcasting Network affiliates
Television channels and stations established in 1975
Family Broadcasting Corporation
HFT-TV
1975 establishments in Florida